Sanders Park is a park in Bromsgrove, Worcestershire formally opened on 14 September 1968. The park is named after two people Mary Beatrice Sanders (1856–1951), and Lucy Mary Maude Sanders (1864–1945) who donated the park to the town.

References 

Parks and open spaces established in 1968
1968 establishments in England
Bromsgrove
Parks and open spaces in Worcestershire